Neurography may refer to:

Nerve conduction study - an electrical test of nerve function
MR Neurography - A type of magnetic resonance imaging that shows nerves